Actionable indecency is a legal doctrine held by the Federal Communications Commission since the 1978 FCC vs. Pacifica case, that broadcast speech can be regulated even if it does not contain the seven dirty words deemed "indecent". 

The FCC states on its website that indecent broadcasts are not actionable between 10 PM and 6 AM; however, in 1987, it announced that "actionable indecency" had been committed in broadcasts after 10 PM.

Criticism of legal basis

Legal scholars have questioned the constitutionality of the doctrine, and indicated that it has been used to silence minorities such as gay men in the past. One legal analysis of the doctrine found that it may no longer be necessary for the FCC itself to exist in order to protect children in the age of new media.

See also
Cause of action
Actionable Offenses: Indecent Phonograph Recordings from the 1890s

References

Notes

Sources

 
 

Mass media regulation
Federal Communications Commission